Saldula connemarae is a species of shore bug in the family Saldidae.

It was discovered in Derrylea Lough, Ireland in 1986, and is named for the region of Connemara.

References

Insects described in 1986
Saldoidini

Taxa named by Gerald Armitage Walton
Fauna of Ireland